St. Paris is a village in Champaign County, Ohio, United States. The population was 2,089 at the 2010 census.

History
The area where St. Paris now stands was originally inhabited by Native Americans. The first white settlers arrived in 1797 and the village was founded in 1831 by David Huffman, who originally named it New Paris, after the French capital city of Paris. Upon learning that another town in Ohio already had that name, he changed the name to St. Paris. St. Paris was incorporated as a village in 1858.

One of the houses in the village, known as the "Monitor House", has been declared a historic site and is listed on the National Register of Historic Places.

Geography
St. Paris is located at  (40.128173, -83.959863).

Demographics

2010 census
As of the census of 2010, there were 2,089 people, 795 households, and 549 families living in the village. The racial makeup of the village was 97.8% White, 0.2% African American, 0.1% Native American, 0.2% Pacific Islander, 0.1% from other races, and 1.4% from two or more races. Hispanic or Latino of any race were 0.5% of the population.

There were 795 households, of which 39.7% had children under the age of 18 living with them, 49.8% were married couples living together, 13.8% had a female householder with no husband present, 5.4% had a male householder with no wife present, and 30.9% were non-families. 27.3% of all households were made up of individuals, and 12.6% had someone living alone who was 65 years of age or older. The average household size was 2.63 and the average family size was 3.16.

The median age in the village was 33.7 years. 31.2% of residents were under the age of 18; 7.2% were between the ages of 18 and 24; 26.6% were from 25 to 44; 22.7% were from 45 to 64; and 12.3% were 65 years of age or older. The gender makeup of the village was 47.8% male and 52.2% female.

2000 census
As of the census of 2000, there were 1,998 people, 781 households, and 556 families living in the village. The population density was 2,302.5 people per square mile (886.7/km). There were 809 housing units at an average density of 932.3 per square mile (359.0/km). The racial makeup of the village was 98.55% White, 0.10% African American, 0.60% Native American, 0.15% from other races, and 0.60% from two or more races. Hispanic or Latino of any race were 0.65% of the population.

There were 781 households, out of which 38.0% had children under the age of 18 living with them, 55.8% were married couples living together, 11.4% had a female householder with no husband present, and 28.8% were non-families. 25.9% of all households were made up of individuals, and 11.4% had someone living alone who was 65 years of age or older. The average household size was 2.56 and the average family size was 3.07.

In the village, the population was spread out, with 29.1% under the age of 18, 9.6% from 18 to 24, 29.6% from 25 to 44, 20.2% from 45 to 64, and 11.6% who were 65 years of age or older. The median age was 33 years. For every 100 females there were 87.1 males. For every 100 females age 18 and over, there were 82.8 males.

The median income for a household in the village was $39,917, and the median income for a family was $47,014. Males had a median income of $35,417 versus $22,326 for females. The per capita income for the village was $16,811. About 8.8% of families and 8.8% of the population were below the poverty line, including 10.8% of those under age 18 and 9.1% of those age 65 or over.

Education
St. Paris is served by Graham Local School District.  Graham High School, a member of the Central Buckeye Conference, is located in St. Paris. There are also Graham Middle School and Graham Elementary School, both of which are newly built.  The Board of Education offices were once located in the old Junior High School downtown, but have now been moved to a new location behind the high school. The Graham Digital Academy (GDA) and A. B. Graham Academy (ABGA) were also located in the building, until A. B. Graham Academy's closure in June 2014. All of these facilities are located on U.S. Route 36.

Government
As of February 2021, the mayor of St. Paris is Brenda Cook. The members of the village council are Randy Smith, Susan Prince, Terry Ervin II, Steve Lett, Lynn Miller, and Chad Hackley.

In 2011, the mayor of St. Paris was Joe Braden, and the members of the village council were Brenda Cook, Stacy Barnhart, Wanda Long, Lynn Miller, Zachary Pillon, and Larry Watkins.

Notes and references

Further reading
 Brown, Kathleen Kite (1975). History of St. Paris (The Pony Wagon Town). St. Paris, Ohio: Kathleen Kite Brown.

External links
 St.Paris Village Website
 Champaign County
 Graham Local Schools

Villages in Champaign County, Ohio
Populated places established in 1831
Villages in Ohio
1831 establishments in Ohio